Chaiwut Thanakamanusorn is a Thai politician. , he serves as Minister of Digital Economy and Society in the second cabinet of Prime Minister Prayut Chan-o-cha. He replaces Puttipong Punnakanta who was removed from office after being found guilty of insurrection during protests that led to the 2014 coup d'état.

Early life and education 
Chaiwut was born on 2 November 1971 in Bang Phutsa Sub-district, Mueang Sing Buri District, Singburi Province. Chaiwut graduated a high school education from Triam Udom Suksa School and graduated with a bachelor's degree in engineering from Chulalongkorn University and then Master of the Engineering from University of Southern California, USA and Master of Arts in Economics from Chulalongkorn University.

Careers 
Chaiwut used to be a lecturer in the Faculty of Business Administration at Rangsit University and used to work at Kasikorn Bank. He worked as an Engineer at Gulf JP Company Limited and was the Executive Director of Community Relations, Gulf Energy Development Public Company.

References 

Living people
1971 births
Chaiwut Thanakamanusorn
Chaiwut Thanakamanusorn
Chaiwut Thanakamanusorn
Chaiwut Thanakamanusorn